Edmond Delfour (1 November 1907 – 19 December 1990) was a French international footballer who played as a midfielder, before later becoming a manager.

Career
Delfour was born in Ris-Orangis. He played for Viry-Châtillon, Draveil, Juvisy-sur-Orge, Stade Français (1928–29), RC Paris (1929–37), RC Roubaix (1937–39), FC Rouen (1939–45) and Red Star Olympique (1945–46). He won two French national tournaments in 1936 and 1940 and one Coupe de France in 1936.

For France national football team he got 41 caps and participated at three edition of FIFA World Cup in 1930, 1934 and 1938, being one of five players to have appeared in all three of the pre-war World Cups.

When he retired from playing football, he started his manager career in Belgium], with KAA La Gantoise, Union Saint-Gilloise, Cercle Brugge and FC Liège. After being a manager in Belgium for many years, he returned to France, and coached teams as Stade Français, Le Havre AC, SC Bastia and US Corte. He also had a spell with Club Sportif de Hammam-Lif. He died in 1990, at the age of 83.

References

External links
 
 

1907 births
1990 deaths
People from Ris-Orangis
Footballers from Essonne
Association football midfielders
French footballers
ES Viry-Châtillon players
Stade Français (association football) players
Racing Club de France Football players
FC Rouen players
Red Star F.C. players
Ligue 1 players
France international footballers
1930 FIFA World Cup players
1934 FIFA World Cup players
1938 FIFA World Cup players
French football managers
RC Roubaix players
FC Rouen managers
Red Star F.C. managers
Le Havre AC managers
Cercle Brugge K.S.V. managers
CS Hammam-Lif managers
SC Bastia managers
Royale Union Saint-Gilloise managers
K.A.A. Gent managers
USC Corte managers